Pangaea in Greek mythology refers to the mountain on which the ancient Greek gods fought the Titans.

Locations in Greek mythology